Nadigaon is a town and a nagar panchayat in Jalaun district in the Indian state of Uttar Pradesh.

Demographics
As of the 2001 Indian census, Nadigaon had a population of 17,175. Males constitute 54% of the population and females 46%. Nadigaon has an average literacy rate of 53%, lower than the national average of 59.5%: male literacy is 64%, and female literacy is 40%. In Nadigaon, 16% of the population is under 6 years of age. Nadigaon was under rule of Kings and The fort is situated at centre of the village. It is almost 21 km far from konch (UP). A river named "pahuj" passes through this village that is how its name became "Nadigaon".

See also
Nadigaon fort,
Rani ka bagh,
Phul bagh,
Krepal singh Dadi mahavidhiyala

References

Cities and towns in Jalaun district